Adelium is a genus of Tenebrioninae (darkling beetles).

Species

 Adelium abbreviatum
 Adelium abnorme
 Adelium aequale
 Adelium aerarium
 Adelium alpicola
 Adelium angulicolle
 Adelium arboricola
 Adelium augurale
 Adelium auratum
 Adelium barbatum
 Adelium bassi
 Adelium breve
 Adelium brevicorne
 Adelium breviusculum
 Adelium browni
 Adelium burneti
 Adelium calosomoides
 Adelium canaliculatum
 Adelium capillatum
 Adelium capitatum
 Adelium cheesmani
 Adelium coeruleum
 Adelium comatum
 Adelium coxi
 Adelium cuprescens
 Adelium cyaneum
 Adelium davisi
 Adelium distortipes
 Adelium dubium
 Adelium ellipticum
 Adelium fergusoni
 Adelium flavicorne
 Adelium flavitarsis
 Adelium geminatum
 Adelium globulosum
 Adelium goudiei
 Adelium hackeri
 Adelium harrisoni
 Adelium helmsi
 Adelium heterodoxum
 Adelium hirsutum
 Adelium homogeneum
 Adelium inconspicuum
 Adelium interruptum
 Adelium irregulare
 Adelium licinoides
 Adelium lindense
 Adelium mackayense
 Adelium mccullochi
 Adelium minor
 Adelium monilicorne
 Adelium murex
 Adelium musgravei
 Adelium neboissi
 Adelium negligens
 Adelium obtusum
 Adelium occidentale
 Adelium orphana
 Adelium ovipenne
 Adelium panageicolle
 Adelium parvulum
 Adelium pestiferum
 Adelium pilosum
 Adelium plicigerum
 Adelium porcatum
 Adelium pulchellum
 Adelium punctatissimum
 Adelium punctipenne
 Adelium pustulosum
 Adelium reductum
 Adelium regulare
 Adelium reticulatum
 Adelium rotundum
 Adelium rugicolle
 Adelium scytalicum
 Adelium similatum
 Adelium sloanei
 Adelium spinicolle
 Adelium steropoides
 Adelium striatum
 Adelium strigipenne
 Adelium subdepressum
 Adelium sublaevigatum
 Adelium subsulcatum
 Adelium taylori
 Adelium tenebroides
 Adelium tropicum
 Adelium vesiculatum
 Adelium vicarium
 Adelium violaceum

References 

Tenebrionidae genera